One Piece Film: Red is a 2022 Japanese animated musical fantasy action-adventure film directed by Gorō Taniguchi and produced by Toei Animation. It is the fifteenth feature film of the One Piece film series, based on the manga of the same name written and illustrated by Eiichiro Oda.

It was first announced on November 21, 2021, in commemoration of the One Piece anime episode 1000's release and following the broadcast of the episode, a teaser trailer and poster was released on November 21, 2021. Its world premiere was in Nippon Budokan, Tokyo on July 22, 2022, for the celebration of 25th anniversary of One Piece manga and released theatrically on August 6, 2022, in Japan.

One Piece Film: Red  received praise for its animation style, fight sequences and musical numbers. The film has grossed over ¥19.70 billion in Japan making it the highest-grossing film of One Piece, the highest-grossing film of Toei Animation, the highest-grossing film of 2022 in Japan, the 5th highest-grossing anime film of all time in Japan, the 5th highest-grossing Japanese film of all time in Japan, and the 8th highest-grossing film of all time in Japan. The film has been number one in box office ranking in Japan for eleven consecutive weeks which only three Japanese films had ever done. As of January 29, the film has grossed over US$246.5 million worldwide, making it the 4th highest-grossing anime film of all-time and 4th highest-grossing Japanese film of all-time.

Plot
The Straw Hat Pirates leave for the island of Elegia to attend a concert by Uta, a world-famous singer. After Uta performs her first song, Luffy goes on stage to reunite with her, revealing that the two of them know each other because Uta is the adopted daughter of "Red-Haired" Shanks. They met when Shanks was based at Luffy's hometown 12 years ago, but one day he returned from a voyage without her, claiming she had left to pursue a career as a singer.

Some pirate crews then attempt to kidnap Uta, but she easily subdues them by conjuring whatever she wants through song. Afterward, Uta tells Luffy that he should stop being a pirate, as she is going to make this concert last forever and create a world with only happiness and peace. When the Straw Hats resist the idea, Uta attacks and traps all of them except Luffy, who is rescued by Trafalgar Law and Bartolomeo. Meanwhile, the Five Elders ruling the World Government deem Uta's power a great threat to the world, and Marine Fleet Admiral Akainu orders a convoy of battleships led by Admirals Kizaru and Fujitora to go to Elegia and subdue her.

Luffy's group is pursued by Uta and the concertgoers, and they meet Gordon, who is Uta's adoptive father and the former king of Elegia. Gordon reveals that he raised Uta to be a great musician and kept her sheltered from the outside world, but when she attained worldwide fame, she began to learn of the suffering inflicted on a great number of her fans by pirates and so decided to put an end to the Pirate Era. Uta then arrives and forces Luffy's group to escape, and Gordon pleads with her to not carry out her plan out of fear for her safety. However, Uta reveals she found an inscription of a song called "Tot Musica" that can unleash a great power, and immobilizes Gordon.

Luffy's group comes across Koby, Helmeppo, and Blueno who are operating undercover for the World Government. Koby reveals that Uta has the power of the Sing-Sing Fruit, which allows her to send people into a dream world known as the Sing-Sing World by singing to them. They and everyone else who watched the concert are trapped in this world, whose reality is completely controlled by Uta. The Sing-Sing World ceases to exist whenever Uta falls asleep; however, Uta has been consuming a drug called wake-shrooms that keeps her awake at all hours and drastically shortens her lifespan. If Uta were to die, everyone in the Sing-Sing World would be trapped there forever.

In the real world, the Marine fleet arrives at Elegia to find the concertgoers all sleeping. They block their hearing to nullify Uta's singing, but Uta assumes control of the concertgoers to overwhelm the Marines and remove their hearing blockers. The Five Elders know that Uta has mere hours left to live and that if she dies, 70% of the world's population would be trapped in the Sing-Sing World. Koby's group helps the pirates free themselves by singing the note they correspond to on the staff, and the Straw Hats head towards the castle to find a weakness in Uta's power. 

In the library, Robin discovers that there is a way to make the worlds converge by summoning Tot Musica, a demonic entity whose existence spans both worlds. If Tot Musica is defeated simultaneously in both worlds, those in the Sing-Sing World will return to reality. Uta resumes her concert in the Sing-Sing World, but her audience begins to resist the idea of living in her world forever. Growing more and more unstable, Uta transforms all of them into inanimate objects. Luffy goes to confront Uta, and she reveals that Shanks abandoned her on Elegia after allegedly destroying and plundering it. Uta decides to kill Luffy in the real world, but is stopped by Shanks and his crew.

Shanks tries to help Uta, but Akainu orders for the Marines to fire on her without regard for the concertgoers, forcing the Red-Haired Pirates to go on the defensive. Terrified at the slaughtering of her subjects and slipping into delirium from the wake-shrooms, Uta summons Tot Musica. She then attacks Luffy in the Sing-Sing World, but Gordon takes the blow instead. He reveals that Tot Musica was actually the one that destroyed Elegia 12 years ago after Uta accidentally summoned him, and Shanks left Uta on Elegia afterward so she could pursue a singing career without being a wanted pirate. Despite this revelation, Uta ends up being consumed by Tot Musica as it moves to consume both versions of Elegia, easily overpowering the pirates and Marines. 

However, Usopp is able to attain a mental link with his father Yasopp via Observation Haki, and this allows the two of them to coordinate simultaneous attacks between the forces of both worlds. After a long and arduous battle, Luffy and Shanks strike the finishing blows to defeat Tot Musica. However, since it has already consumed everyone on Elegia, those in the Sing-Sing World do not return. Uta rejects a medicine from Shanks to cure the effects of the wake shrooms in order to sing a song that will bring back everyone. Once she does this, the Marine forces move to seize her, but Shanks repels them with his Conqueror's Haki. 

As the Marines retreat, Shanks and Uta reconcile as father and daughter. Luffy wakes up on the Thousand Sunny after his crew has already departed Elegia. He is able to see the Red-Haired Pirates' ship sailing away and looks on at the crew standing over a coffin, presumably containing Uta's body.

Voice cast

Production

Development
Gorō Taniguchi previously directed the 1998 OVA, One Piece: Defeat The Pirate Ganzak!, which was produced by Production I.G. It was the first animated adaptation of One Piece manga, released before the anime series broadcast and had limited screenings in Japanese theaters. Oda stated that Taniguchi was "the first person to ever animate Luffy". After the first announcement of the film in November 2021, Taniguchi said that he wanted to express a One Piece that had never been seen before and that he would show it in One Piece Film: Red.

According to Shinji Shimizu, a producer of the One Piece anime at Toei Animation, One Piece Film: Red is the One Piece film that Eiichiro Oda most actively participated in the development of. Oda is the executive producer, character designer, and also script reviewer of the film. He also said that the film will be different from the previous One Piece films, saying its animation will primarily be in 2D but in some scenes will be in 3D CGI to make it more impactful.

The script for the film was developed by Oda, Taniguchi, and Tsutomu Kuroiwa for over two years. After finishing, Oda praised the final script saying, "It's fantastic!". Tsutomu Kuroiwa, the screenwriter, assured that One Piece Film: Red would be a great movie that would touch many hearts.

Music

The film score was composed by Yasutaka Nakata, and the theme song for the film is "New Genesis" performed by Ado and produced by Nakata. Ado also performed six more songs featuring Mrs. Green Apple, Vaundy, Fake Type., Hiroyuki Sawano, Yuta Orisaka, and Motohiro Hata in each and Toei Animation and Ado released their respective music videos on YouTube. The album Uta’s Songs: One Piece Film Red, containing all the vocal songs from the film was released on August 10, 2022, while the score album published by Avex, containing 47 tracks, was released on October 28, 2022.

Marketing

Ado performed seven songs featuring Yasutaka Nakata, Mrs. Green Apple, Vaundy, Fake Type., Hiroyuki Sawano, Yuta Orisaka, and Motohiro Hata in each, and Toei Animation and Ado released video songs on YouTube for the movie's promotions; these songs are also featured in the movie as the singing voice for character Uta. Since the theatrical release of the film in Japan, there have been multiple giveaways to the theater audience, including different manga and databook by Eiichiro Oda which were printed in millions of copies and were giveaways for most of the weekends since the release. The One Piece anime's regular episodes' releases were put on hold for three weeks and the film's three tie-in episodes were broadcast after the film's release in Japan.

Release

The film had its world premiere in Nippon Budokan, Tokyo on July 22, 2022, and was released theatrically on 495 screens in Japan on August 6, 2022, by its distributor Toei Company. It had its IMAX screenings in Japan in 27 theaters, which is the first time for a One Piece film. It is also available in MX4D, 4DX, and Dolby Atmos.

Pathé Films released the film in French speaking regions, subbed and dubbed in French, In France, the film premiered in Le Grand Rex, Paris and 481 screens on August 6, 2022 and was released on August 10, 2022, in 631 screens. In Belgium, Luxembourg, Switzerland (French-speaking region) and Swiss German regions it will be released on October 13, 2022. On August 10, 2022, it was also released in Morocco, Tunisia, Algeria, Mauritius and Mali. In Djibouti, the film was released on August 11, 2022 and on August 12, 2022, the film was released in Benin, Burkina Faso, Cameroon, Republic of the Congo, Democratic Republic of the Congo, Guinea, Niger, Senegal, Togo and Madagascar.

In Taiwan, the film was released on August 19, 2022. In China, the film premiered at Beijing International Film Festival on August 21, 2022. In Hong Kong and Macau, it was released in Cantonese, subbed and dubbed on August 25, 2022. In Thailand, the film had fan screening from August 16 to 21 and was widely released on August 25 by distributor Japan Anime Movie (JAM) Thailand.

Odex announced that they will distribute the film in Singapore, Philippines, Malaysia and India. In Singapore, the film was released on September 29, 2022. In Malaysia, the film released on September 22, 2022. In the Netherlands, the film released on September 8, 2022. In Philippines, fan screenings on September 17 and 18, 2022 and was released on September 28, 2022. In Indonesia, CBI Pictures announced limited premiere release on September 16 to 18, 2022. In India, the film was released on October 7, 2022, by Odex and PVR Pictures. In Germany, the film was premiered on October 11, 2022, at Berlin and was released on October 13, 2022, in Germany and Austria by Crunchyroll. In Romania on October 14, 2022, in Romanian sub and dub. In select MENA countries, Front Row Filmed Entertainment was released the film on November 3, 2022, with English and Arabic subtitles. In Spain on November 4, 2022, was released subbed and dubbed in Spanish and Catalan by SelectaVisión, In U.S. and Canada, it was released on November 4, 2022, and in Australia and New Zealand, it was released on November 3, 2022, by Crunchyroll. Film Red became the first One Piece film to be distributed under the Crunchyroll brand after Sony Pictures acquired Crunchyroll in 2021 and merged it with Funimation in 2022.

In U.K and Ireland, the film was released on the 4th of November 2022 by Anime Limited. CGV released the movie in Vietnam on November 25, 2022, by Tagger with a teaser announced before the release in their local Youtube channel. In Italy the movie will have its premiére at Lucca Comics and Games 2022 and will be released in theaters by Koch Media's Anime Factory brand in autumn. Diamond Films has been teasing a release of One Piece media in Latin America. In Pakistan,  the film was released on October 7. In Israel, the film was released on December 1. In Portuguese-speaking countries, the film was shown in Brazil on November 2 by Diamond Films, and in Portugal on November 3 by NOS Audiovisuais.

Reception

Box office

Japan
The film was released on weekend and became a box office hit in the country. On its opening day, the film had box office revenues and admissions of ¥1,232,095,230 and 869,407 respectively. It is the biggest opening for a One Piece film ever, the third film in Japanese history to make over 1 billion yen on opening day, the best Saturday opening ever for IMAX, and also the second biggest opening day of all the time in Japan. In its second day, it had ¥1,022,141,800 and 710,145 box office revenue and admissions respectively, totaling to ¥2,254,237,030 and 1,579,552 in the weekend. This makes the film the best opening weekend for August in Japan, the biggest weekend box office of 2022 so far, the highest ever opening weekend for distributor Toei Company, the second-biggest two-day opening weekend for a film in Japanese history, and also the second ever film in Japan to gross more than 1 billion yen two days in a row. In 8 days, the film has already surpassed 5 billion yen on 3.6 million admissions, making it the second fastest film to reach that box office record of all the time in Japan. In 10 days, the film became the highest-grossing film in the One Piece franchise after it earned more than 7.06 billion yen (US$52.97 million) with over 5 million tickets sold in 502 screens and overtook One Piece Film: Z total box office revenue in Japan. In 13 days, the film had grossed more than 8 billion yen with over 5.7 million admissions. It is the second-fastest film in Japanese box office history to reach 8 billion yen after Demon Slayer: Mugen Train. As of its 3rd weekend, the film grossed ¥9,281,365,450 with over 6.65 million admissions. It surpassed Detective Conan: The Bride of Halloween and Studio Ghibli's Arrietty. In 20 days, the film grossed over ¥10 billion with over 7.2 million admissions. The film became the second-fastest film in Japan to reach the 10 billion yen milestone surpassing the mark 5 days ahead of Hayao Miyazaki’s Spirited Away, and the 41st film in Japan to ever pass this mark. As of its 4th weekend, the film ranked first place and grossed ¥11.454 billion (US$83.32 million) with over 8.2 million admissions. In 26 days, the film grossed over ¥12 billion (US$87.26 million) with over 8.6 million tickets sold. The film is the second fastest film ever to reach ¥12 billion and it overtook Top Gun: Maverick as the second-highest-grossing film in 2022 in Japan which Japanese box offices track as December 2021 to November 2022. As of its 6th weekend, the film grossed over ¥13.87 billion (US$100.48 million) with 9.94 million admissions making it the highest-grossing film of 2022. As of 38th day in Japanese theaters, the film has grossed more than 13.94 billion yen on the back of more than 10 million tickets sold. It is the 21st film to ever breach the 10 million tickets sold and the fourth fastest film to do so in Japan. As of its 7th weekend, the film grossed over 14.9 billion yen (US$103.8 million) on 10.72 million admissions, making it the seventh top-grossing anime film of all time in Japan after surpassing Makoto Shinkai's 2019 film Weathering With You (14.19 billion yen). In 46 days, the film sailed to over 15.006 billion yen (US$108.57 million) at the box office on the back of 10.76 million tickets sold to Japanese audiences. Its the 13th film to have ever crossed the 15 billion yen mark in Japan. As of its 8th weekend, the film grossed over 15.7 billion yen (US$108.7 million) on 11.26 million admissions, making it the 6th highest-grossing anime film of all time and 11th highest-grossing film of all time in Japan, surpassing Hayao Miyazaki’s Ponyo and James Cameron's Avatar. As of its 11th weekend, the film has been 2022 box office number-one film in Japan for eleven consecutive weeks making it the fifth film (including hollywood films) in Japanese history to do so and grossed 17.1 billion yen on 12.31 million admissions. As of its 12th weekend, the film has grossed a total of 17.356 billion yen on the back of 12.5 million tickets sold. It is currently the ninth highest-grossing film of all time in Japan after it has overtaken both Harry Potter and the Chamber of Secrets and Bayside Shakedown 2. As of its 14th weekend, the film box office revenue has surpassed 18 billion yen (US$122.7 million) on 13 million admissions and has been number one position in ranking  for 13 weekends.
At the end of year 2022, it is reported that the film has been in the Top 10 Japanese Box office for 20 consecutive weeks, beating the likes of the original Avatar, Weathering With You and Frozen.  Also, it is officially announced that the film is the highest-earning film of 2022 in Japan.

Overall, the film has earned a total of 19.70 billion yen (about US$152 million) in its 177 days run in Japanese theaters, making it the 8th highest-earning film of all-time in Japan and the 5th highest-earning anime film of all-time in Japan.

Other territories

 In France, the film premiered in Le Grand Rex, Paris for more than 2,700 audience and other cinemas on August 6, 2022. With 119,311 total admissions, the film became One Piece franchise's biggest hit in French cinemas and the best premiere of all-time for a Japanese animated film in France. Also, the film set another box office record with having the highest number of first-day ticket sales in the country for an anime film ever. It surpassed the previous opening day record of Pokémon: The Movie 2000 after having total admissions (including premiere) of 267,631. In 5 days, the film ranked first place in its opening weekend box office and sold 488,631 tickets (including premiere) exceeding the result at the same stage of Jujutsu Kaisen 0 (293,331 tickets), My Hero Academia: World Heroes' Mission (118,525 tickets) and Demon Slayer: Kimetsu no Yaiba – The Movie: Mugen Train (330,000 tickets). In 7 days, the film had sold 575,182 tickets and became the second best 7-days box office admission for a Japanese animated film in France behind Pokémon: The Movie 2000 (807,806 tickets). As of August 28, the film had sold 855,100 tickets (US$6,067,077) and had exceeded the total admission of Demon Slayer: Kimetsu no Yaiba – The Movie: Mugen Train (727,889 tickets). The film is nearing 1 million admission in France by selling 937,077 tickets as of the fourth weekend and 977,000 tickets as of the ten weekend.
 In Germany and Austria, the film had recorded a number of 100,000 visitors and occupies first place in the German Cinema Charts on its opening day. Additionally, the movie received an enormous amount of more than a quarter of a million viewers during its opening weekend and came in a first position on the Weekly Chart. After running for less than two weeks in the theaters, the film has reached an impressive number of over 300,000 visitors.
 In United States, the film earned $4.8 million on its opening day, beating Black Adam for the day and making it already the highest-grossing One Piece film in the country, surpassing One Piece: Stampede ($1.3 million). It went on to debut to $9.3 million, finishing second behind Black Adam.
 In China, the film became the fastest selling film in 12th Beijing International Film Festival after its tickets was sold out in a minute just after its release. The film ranked first place and earned ¥74.96 million on its opening weekend despite only about 30% to 40% of movie theaters in China were opened. On its second weekend, the film also ranked first place in box office ranking and grossed ¥33.5 million ($4.8 million). In 10 days, the film cumulative box office is ¥127 million ($18.10 million).
 In Taiwan, the film ranked first place and grossed NT$57.793 million in its opening weekend. It surpassed the total box office revenue of One Piece: Stampede (NT$54.2M) in Taiwan. Also, the film had surpassed Jujutsu Kaisen 0 opening weekend box office revenue (NT$55.83 million) and became the best opening weekend in 2022 for a Japanese animated film in the country. As of its 4th weekend, the film grossed over NT$155 million (US$5.01 million) and remained first place for 4 consecutive weeks in box office ranking in Taiwan.
 In Thailand, the film became the highest grossing opening day and opening weekend of all-time for a Japanese Animated film in Thailand after it earned 17.8 million baht and 71.70 million baht respectively. In the first week, it became the fastest anime film to gross 100 million bhat. Additionally, the film has been number one in box office ranking for two consecutive weeks.
 In Indonesia, the film has over 1.36 million admissions, making it the best-selling anime film ever in the country.
 In Saudi Arabia, the film ranked number one in its opening weekend at Saudi Arabian box office, selling 61,000 tickets and earning US$1.05 million. It is the biggest-ever opening weekend for a Japanese animated film in the country. The film sold 14% higher than Jujutsu Kaisen 0 and 50% more than Demon Slayer The Movie: Mugen Train. It also achieved one of the biggest-ever opening days for a PG-12 movie in the country, the second biggest-ever opening day for an animated film behind Universal’s Minions: The Rise of Gru, and earned 286% more than Sonic the Hedgehog 2.
 In India, the film has grossed  in just 10 days after its debut, surpassing the entire box office earnings of Dragon Ball Super: Super Hero despite its limited distribution.
 In South Korea, the film grossed ₩428.15 million in its opening day surpassing already the total box office revenue of One Piece: Stampede (₩189,707,460). In 12 days, the film earned ₩1.831 billion, making it the highest grossing One Piece film in South Korea after surpassing the total box office revenue (₩1.710 billion) of One Piece Film: Gold in the country.

, the film has grossed  million worldwide, making it the 4th highest-grossing anime film of all-time and 4th highest-grossing Japanese film of all-time.

Critical response
  Audiences polled by CinemaScore gave the film an average grade of "A" on an A+ to F scale, while those at PostTrak gave it an 88% overall positive score.

Music chart
The film's main theme song "New Genesis" by Ado, topped Apple Music's Global Top 100 charts, making it the first for a Japanese song, and the number one song in the world, beating out songs from Beyoncé and DJ Khaled.

In August 31, Oricon reported that Ado has three of the tracker's digital rankings for three consecutive weeks which happen for the first time ever in Oricon's history. Also, she is the first artist ever in Oricon's history to have five songs in the "Top 5 Streaming Chart" doing so for the past two weeks. These five songs from the film ("New Genesis", "I'm Invincible", "Backlight", "Fleeting Lullaby", and "Tot Musica") had been dominating the top five "Weekly Streaming Chart" in two weeks and its the first time ever that each song in the top five had reached over 10 million plays over the last week. Furthermore, the album Uta's Songs: One Piece Film Red has been in the top place in the "Weekly Digital Album Ranking" for the past three weeks. As for the main theme song, "New Genesis", it has been the number one in "Weekly Digital Single (Single Song) Ranking" for over the past four weeks and it marks the second time a solo female artist has topped the charts for a month after LiSA’s "Homura" did so for 13 weeks back in late 2020 / early 2021. This is its 12th week at number one (106,916,252 plays) and is the 4th fastest song in Japanese history to reach 100 million plays.

On September 7, 2022, Ado broke another record after Oricon reported that she had three of the tracker's digital rankings for four consecutive weeks on which she's the only artist who had ever done so.

Accolades

See also
 List of One Piece films
 List of One Piece media

Notes

References

External links
 Official website 
 
 
 

Red
Toei Animation films
2022 anime films
Crunchyroll anime
Films about singers